Octopus is the fourth album by British progressive rock band Gentle Giant, released in 1972. It was the band's last album with founding member Phil Shulman and the first with new drummer John Weathers, who would remain with the band until their dissolution in 1980. Octopus remains a highly regarded example of the progressive rock genre and is generally considered to represent the start of the band's peak period.

Production
Octopus was allegedly named by Phil Shulman's wife Roberta as a pun on "octo opus" (eight musical works, reflecting the album's eight tracks).
In 2004, Ray Shulman commented "(Octopus) was probably our best album, with the exception, perhaps of Acquiring the Taste. We started with the idea of writing a song about each member of the band. Having a concept in mind was a good starting point for writing. I don't know why, but despite the impact of The Who's Tommy and Quadrophenia, almost overnight concept albums were suddenly perceived as rather naff and pretentious".

Musical style and themes
The album maintained Gentle Giant's trademark of broad and challenging integrated styles. One of the highlights was the intricate madrigal-styled vocal workout "Knots". The album's lyrics are generally based on literature and philosophy: "The Advent of Panurge" is inspired by the books of Gargantua and Pantagruel by François Rabelais; "A Cry for Everyone" is inspired by the work and beliefs of the Algerian-French writer Albert Camus, while the song "Knots" is inspired by the book Knots by the Scottish psychiatrist R. D. Laing.

Releases
On 30 October 2015, a Steven Wilson remix was released on CD/Blu-ray via the band's Alucard label. Three tracks (1, 2 & 5) could not be discretely remixed since one multi-track reel was missing. Instead, those three tracks were upmixed to 5.1 surround using the Penteo surround software.  The remaining five tracks were remixed to 5.1 by Steven Wilson.

Cover
The UK release by Vertigo featured art by Roger Dean. Dean's logo appears inside the lyrics booklet.

US and Canadian releases were released by Columbia and used a different cover by Charles White. Early versions of this cover were die-cut into a jar shape.

Critical reception

Later reviews about the album have remained positive. AllMusic have declared that Octopus is "an album that has withstood the test of time a lot better than anyone might have expected."

In the Q & Mojo Classic Special Edition Pink Floyd & The Story of Prog Rock, the album came #16 in its list of "40 Cosmic Rock Albums". In The 100 Greatest Prog Albums Of All Time, by ProgMagazine, Octopus stands at number 65.

In 2013, progressive death metal band Witherscape covered the track "A Cry for Everyone", and issued it for release on their The Inheritance album.

The 2015 reissue of the album, mixed by Steven Wilson, entered the BBC Rock Chart at No. 34.

Track listing

Personnel
Gentle Giant
Gary Green - electric guitar (tracks 1, 3, 4, 5, 8), percussion
Kerry Minnear - piano (tracks 1-5, 7, 8), Hammond organ (tracks 1-5, 7, 8), Minimoog (tracks 1, 3, 5, 8), electric piano (tracks 2, 4, 8), Mellotron (tracks 2, 7, 8), Clavinet (track 1, 4), regal (track 6), vibraphone (tracks 4, 8), cello (tracks 2, 6), percussion, lead vocals (tracks 1, 4 and 7),  backing vocals
Derek Shulman - lead vocals (tracks 1-4, 8), alto saxophone (track 5)
Phil Shulman - trumpet (tracks 1, 2), tenor saxophone (tracks 4, 5), baritone saxophone (track 4), mellophone (track 7), lead vocals (tracks 1, 4, 6 and 8), backing vocals
Ray Shulman - bass guitar, violin (tracks 2, 5, 6), viola (track 6), electric violin (tracks 4, 8), acoustic guitar (track 6), percussion, backing vocals
John Weathers - drums (tracks 1-5, 7, 8), bongos (tracks 3, 8), varispeed cymbal (tracks 4, 8), xylophone (tracks 4, 6)

Production
Gentle Giant - Production
Martin Rushent - Engineering
Cliff Morris - Mastering
Geoff Young - Tape operator
Murray Krugman - Over-all American Supervision

Design
John Berg - Cover concept & design
Fluid Drive - Art
Charles White III - Illustration
Kenny Kneitel - Design
Michael Doret - Lettering

Charts

Release history

References

Gentle Giant albums
Albums with cover art by Roger Dean (artist)
1972 albums
Columbia Records albums
Repertoire Records albums
Vertigo Records albums